Radiotelephony procedure (also on-air protocol and voice procedure) includes various techniques used to clarify, simplify and standardize spoken communications over two-way radios, in use by the armed forces, in civil aviation, police and fire dispatching systems, citizens' band radio (CB), and amateur radio.

Voice procedure communications are intended to maximize clarity of spoken communication and reduce errors in the verbal message by use of an accepted nomenclature. It consists of a signalling protocol such as the use of abbreviated codes like the CB radio ten-code, Q codes in amateur radio and aviation, police codes, etc., and jargon.

Some elements of voice procedure are understood across many applications, but significant variations exist. The armed forces of the NATO countries have similar procedures in order to make cooperation easier.

The impacts of having radio operators who are not well-trained in standard procedures can cause significant operational problems and delays, as exemplified by one case of amateur radio operators during Hurricane Katrina, in which:...many of the operators who were deployed had excellent go-kits and technical ability, but were seriously wanting in traffic handling skill. In one case it took almost 15 minutes to pass one 25 word message.

Introduction 
Radiotelephony procedures encompass international regulations, official procedures, technical standards, and commonly understood conventions intended to ensure efficient, reliable, and inter-operable communications via all modes of radio communications. The most well-developed and public procedures are contained in the Combined Communications Electronics Board's Allied Communications Procedure ACP 125(G): Communications Instructions Radiotelephone Procedures.

These procedures consist of many different components. The three most important ones are:
 Voice procedures—what to say
 Speech technique—how to say it
 Microphone technique—how to say it into a microphone
These procedures have been developed, tested under the most difficult of conditions, then revised to implement the lessons learned, many times since the early 1900s. According to ACP 125(G) and the Virginia Defense Force Signal Operating Instructions:Voice procedure is designed to provide the fastest and most accurate method of speech transmission. All messages should be pre-planned, brief and straightforward. Ideally, messages should be written down: even brief notes reduce the risk of error. Messages should be constructed clearly and logically in order not to confuse the recipient.Voice procedure is necessary because:
 Speech on a congested voice net must be clear, concise and unambiguous. To avoid interference between speech and data, it will often be expedient to assign the passage of data traffic to logistic or admin nets rather than to those directly associated with command and control.
 It must be assumed that all transmissions will be intercepted by a portion of the civilian population. The use of a standard procedure will help reduce the threat of spreading rumors or creating panic among those not involved in an emergency response.
 Some form of discipline is needed to ensure that transmissions do not overlap. If two people send traffic at the same time, the result is chaos.
Radio operators must talk differently because two-way radios reduce the quality of human speech in such a way that it becomes harder to understand. A large part of the radio-specific procedures is the specialized language that has been refined over more than 100 years.

There are several main methods of communication over radio, and they should be used in this order of preference:
 Procedure words
 Standard (predefined) phraseology (for most things in aviation and maritime use)
 Plain language dialogue (for things that can't be handled by phraseology)
 Formal messages
 Narrative messages
 Dialogue (normal conversation)
 Brevity codes, including Ten-codes, and Phillips Code; and operating signals, including 92 code, Q code, and Z code; should be used as a last choice, as these lists of codes are so extensive that it is unlikely that all participants have the full and correct definitions memorized. All of those listed here except the ten-code are designed exclusively for use in Morse code or teletypewriter use, and are thus unsuitable for use on voice circuits.

International Radio Regulations 
All radio communications on the planet operate under regulations created by the ITU-R, which prescribes most of the basic voice radio procedures, and these are further codified by each individual country.

United States radio regulations 
In the U.S., radio communications are regulated by the NTIA and the FCC. Regulations created by the FCC are codified in Title 47 of the Code of Federal Regulations:
 Part 4—Disruptions to Communications
 Part 20—Commercial Mobile Services
 Part 80—Stations in the Maritime Services (Maritime Mobile Service)
 Part 87—Aviation Services
 Part 90—Private Land Mobile Radio Services (Concerning licensed wireless communications for businesses and non-federal governments)
 Subpart C—Business Band
 Part 95—Personal Radio Services (MURS, FRS, GMRS, and CB radio)
 Part 97—Amateur Radio Service (Ham radio)
 Part 300—NTIA Rules and Regulations

Radio call signs 
Radio call signs are a globally unique identifier assigned to all stations that are required to obtain a license in order to emit RF energy. The identifiers consist of from 3 to 9 letters and digits, and while the basic format of the call signs are specified by the ITU-R Radio Regulations, Article 19, Identification of stations, the details are left up to each country's radio licensing organizations.

Official call signs 
Each country is assigned a range of prefixes, and the radiotelecommunications agencies within each country then responsible for allocating call signs, within the format defined by the RR, as they see fit. The Radio Regulations require most radio stations to regularly identify themselves by means of their official station call sign or other unique identifier.

Functional designators 
Because official radio call signs have no inherent meaning outside of the above-described patterns, and other than individually licensed Amateur radio stations, do not serve to identify the person using the radio, they are not usually desirable as the primary means of identifying which person, department, or function is transmitting or is being contacted.

For this reason, functional designators (a.k.a. tactical call signs) are frequently used to provide such identification. Such designators are not sufficient to meet the FCC requirements that stations regularly identify the license they are operating under, typically every x number of minutes and at the end of each transmission, where x ranges from 10 to 30 minutes (longer for broadcast stations).

For the some radio services, the FCC authorizes alternate station IDs, typically in situations where the alternate station ID serves the purposes of identifying the transmitting station better than the standard ITU format. These include:
 Aircraft—the registration number (tail number) of the aircraft, preceded by the type (typical of general aviation aircraft); or the aircraft operator nickname assigned by the FAA, followed by the flight number (typical of scheduled airline services).
 Land mobile—Name of the station licensee (typically abbreviated), location of station, name of city, or facility served, followed by additional digits following the more general ID.
 Land mobile railroad—Name of railroad, followed by the train number, engine number etc.

Call signs in the United States 
The United States has been assigned all call signs with the prefixes K, N, and W, as well as AAA–ALZ. Allocating call signs within these groups is the responsibility of the National Telecommunications and Information Administration (almost all government stations) or the Federal Communications Commission (all other stations), and they subdivide the radio call signs into the following groups:

Military call sign systems 
 AAA–AEZ and ALA–ALZ are reserved for Department of the Army stations
 AFA–AKZ are assigned to the Department of the Air Force
 NAA–NZZ is jointly assigned to the Department of the Navy and the U.S. Coast Guard.

Amateur call sign systems 
Ham station call signs begin with A, K, N or W, and have a single digit from 0 to 9 that separates the 1 or 2 letter prefix from the 1 to 3 letter suffix (special event stations have only three characters: the prefix, the digit, and a one-letter suffix).

Maritime call signs 
Maritime call signs have a much more complex structure, and are sometimes replaced with the name of the vessel or a Maritime Mobile Service Identity (MMSI) number.

Microphone technique 
Microphones are imperfect reproducers of the human voice, and will distort the human voice in ways that make it unintelligible unless a set of techniques are used to avoid the problems. The recommended techniques vary, but generally align with the following guidelines, which are extracted from the IARU Emergency Telecommunications Guide
 Hold the microphone close to your cheek, just off to the side of your mouth, positioned so that you talk across, and not into, the microphone. This reduces plosives (popping sounds from letters such as "P").
 Speak in a normal, clear, calm voice. Talking loudly or shouting does not increase the volume of your voice at the receiving radios, but will distort the audio, because loud sounds result in over-modulation, which directly causes distortion.
 Speak at a normal pace, or preferably, slower. Not leaving gaps between words causes problems with radio transmissions that are not as noticeable when one is talking face-to-face.
 Pronounce words carefully, making each syllable and sound clearly distinguishable.
 Adjust the microphone gain so that a normal voice 50 mm away from the microphone will produce full modulation. Setting the gain higher than that will transmit greater amounts of background noise, making your voice harder to hear, or even distorted. Noise-cancelling microphones can assist in this, but do not substitute for proper mic placement and gain settings.
 If you use a headset boom microphone, be aware that lower-cost models have omni-directional elements that will pick up background noise. Models with uni-directional or noise-cancelling elements are best.
 Do not use voice operated transmission (VOX) microphone circuits for emergency communication. The first syllable or so of each transmission will not actually be transmitted, while extraneous noises may also trigger transmission unintentionally.
 If not operating in a vehicle, use a foot push-to-talk switch so that both of your hands are free to transmit.
 Always leave a little extra time (1 second will suffice) between depressing the PTT switch and speaking. Numerous electronic circuits, including tone squelch, RF squelch and power-saving modes, need a substantial fraction of that time in order to allow your signal to be transmitted or received. This is especially true of repeaters, which might also have a "kerchunk" timer that prevents brief transmissions from keying the transmitter, and doubly true of linked repeaters, which have multiple sets of such circuits that must be activated before all stations can hear you.
 One must also leave gaps between the last station that transmitted and the next station, because such gaps are necessary to let other stations break in with emergency traffic. A pause of two seconds, approximated by a count of "one, one thousand" is sufficient in many conditions.
Similarly, the U.S. military radio procedures recommend headsets with noise-cancelling microphones:Use of Audio Equipment. In many situations, particularly in noisy or difficult conditions, the use of headsets fitted with a noise cancelling microphone is preferable to loudspeakers as a headset will aid concentration and the audibility of the incoming signal. The double-sided, noise cancelling microphone is designed to cancel out surrounding noise, for example engine noise or gunfire, allowing speech entering on one side to pass freely. The microphone should be as close to the mouth as possible.The U.S. Navy radio operator training manuals contain similar guidelines, including NAVPERS 10228-B, Radioman 3 & 2 training course (1957 edition):

Dos:
 Do listen before transmitting. Unauthorized break-in is lubberly and causes confusion. Often neither transmission gets through.
 Do speak clearly and distinctly. Slurred syllables and clipped speech are both hard to understand. A widespread error among untrained operators is failure to emphasize vowels sufficiently.
 Do speak slowly. Unless the action officer is listening he will have to rely on the copy being typed or written at the other end. Give the recorder a chance to get it all the first time. You will save time and repetitions that way. 
 Do avoid extremes of pitch. A high voice cuts best through interference, but is shrill and unpleasant if too high. A lower pitch is easier on the ear, but is hard to understand through background noises if too low.
 Do be natural. Maintain a normal speaking rhythm. Group words in a natural manner. Send your message phrase by phrase rather than word by word.
 Do use standard pronunciation. Speech with sectional peculiarities is difficult for persons from other parts of the country. Talkers using the almost standard pronunciation of a broadcast network announcer are easiest to understand.
 Do speak in a moderately strong voice. This will override unavoidable background noises and prevent drop-outs.
 Do keep correct distance between lips and microphone. If the distance is too great, speech is inaudible and background noises creep in; if too small, blaring and blasting result.
 Do shield your microphone. Turn your head away from noise generating sources while transmitting.
 Do keep the volume of a hand set earphone low.
 Do keep speaker volumes to a moderate level.
 Do give an accurate evaluation in response to a request for a radio check. A transmission with feedback and/or a high level of background noise is not loud and clear even though the message can be understood.
 Do pause momentarily, when possible, and interrupt your carrier. This allows any other station with higher precedence traffic to break in.
 Do adhere strictly to prescribed procedures. Up-to-date radiotelephone procedure is found in the effective edition of ACP 125.
 Do transact your business and get off the air. Preliminary calls only waste time when communication is good and the message short. It is NOT necessary to blow into a microphone to test it, nor to repeat portions of messages when no repetition has been requested.
Do Nots:
 Don't transmit while surrounded by other persons loudly discussing the next maneuver or event. It confuses receiving stations, and a serious security violation can result.
 Don't hold the microphone button in the push-to-talk position until absolutely ready to transmit. Your carrier will block communications on the net.
 Don't hold a hand set in such a position while speaking that there is a possibility of having feedback from the earphone added to other extraneous noises.
 Don't hold a hand set loosely. A firm pressure on the microphone button prevents unintentional release and consequent signal drop-out.
 Don't send test signals for longer than 10 seconds.
Many radio systems also require the operator to wait a few seconds after depressing the PTT button before speaking, and so this is a recommended practice on all systems. The California Statewide EMS Operations and Communications Resource Manual explains why:Key your transmitter before engaging in speech. The complexities in communications system design often introduce delay in the time it takes to turn on the various components comprising the system. Transmitters take time to come up to full power output, tone squelch decoding equipment requires time to open receivers and receiver voting systems take time to select the best receiver. While these events generally are accomplished in less than one second's time, there are many voice transmissions that could be missed in their entirety if the operator did not delay slightly before beginning his/her voice message. Pausing one second after depressing the push-to-talk button on the microphone or handset is sufficient in most cases to prevent missed words or responses.Further, transmissions should be kept as short as possible; a maximum limit of 20 or 30 seconds is typically suggested:Transmissions should generally be kept to less than 20 seconds, or within the time specifically allocated by the system. Most radio systems limit transmissions to less than 30 seconds to prevent malfunctioning transmitters or accidentally keyed microphones from dominating a system, and will automatically stop transmitting at the expiration of the allowed time cutting off additional audio.

Speech technique 
Communicating by voice over two-way radios is more difficult than talking with other people face-to-face or over the telephone. The human voice is changed dramatically by two-way radio circuits. In addition to cutting off important audio bandwidth at both the low and high ends of the human speech spectrum (reducing the bandwidth by at least half), other distortions of the voice occur in the microphone, transmitter, receiver, and speaker—and the radio signal itself is subject to fading, interruptions, and other interference. All of these make human speech more difficult to recognize; in particular, momentary disruptions or distortions of the signal are likely to block the transmission of entire syllables.

The best way to overcome these problems is by greatly reducing the number of single-syllable words used. This is very much counter to the human nature of taking shortcuts, and so takes training, discipline, and having all operators using the same language, techniques, and procedures.

Method of speech 

Several radio operation procedures manuals, including ACP 125(G) teach the same mnemonic of Rhythm, Speed, Volume, and Pitch (RSVP):
 Rhythm Use short sentences divided into sensible phrases which maintain a natural rhythm; they should not be spoken word by word. Where pauses occur, the press-to-talk should be released to minimize transmission time and permit stations to break in when necessary.
 Speed Speak slightly slower than for normal conversation. Where a message is to be written down by the recipients, or in difficult conditions, extra time should be allowed to compensate for the receiving station experiencing the worst conditions. Speed of transmission is easily adjusted by increasing or decreasing the length of pauses between phrases, as opposed to altering the gaps between words; the latter will create an unnatural, halted style of speech, which is difficult to understand.
 Volume Speak quietly when using whisper facilities, otherwise the volume should be as for normal conversation. Shouting causes distortion.
 Pitch The voice should be pitched slightly higher than for normal conversation to improve clarity.
According to the UK's Radiotelephony Manual, CAP 413, radio operators should talk at a speed of fewer than 100 words per minute.

Radio discipline 
Communicating over a half-duplex, shared circuit with multiple parties requires a large amount of discipline in following the established procedures and conventions, because whenever one particular radio operator is transmitting, that operator can not hear any other station on the channel being used.

ABC—Accuracy, Brevity, Clarity 
The initialism ABC is commonly used as a memory aid to reinforce the three most important rules about what to transmit.

The Five Ws 

Whenever a report or a request is transmitted over a two-way radio, the operator should consider including the standard Five Ws in the transmission, so as to eliminate additional requests for information that may occur and thereby delay the request (and other communications).
 Who—needs something
 What—do they need
 Why—do they need it
 When—do they need it
 Where—do they need it

Other rules 
 Think before you speak
 Listen before you speak
 Answer all calls promptly
 Keep the airways free of unnecessary talk
 Be brief and to the point
 Only transmit facts
 Do not act as a relay station unless the net control asks for one

Voice procedures 
The procedures described in this section can be viewed as the base of all voice radio communications procedures.

Service-specific procedures 
However, the international aviation and maritime industries, because their global expansion in the 20th century coincided with, and were heavily integral to the development of voice procedures and other aspects in the development of two-way radio technology, gradually developed their own variations on these procedures.

Aeronautical Mobile Service 

Voice communications procedures for international air traffic control and communications among airplanes are defined by the following International Civil Aviation Organization documents:
 Annex 10—Aeronautical Telecommunications, Volume II—Communications Procedures including those with PANS status,
 Procedures for Air Navigation Services—Air Traffic Management (PANS-ATM, ICAO Doc 4444)
 ICAO Doc 9432 (AN/925) Manual of Radiotelephony.
Refinements and localization of these procedures can be done by each member country of ICAO.
 United States
 FAA Pilot Controller Glossary
 United Kingdom
 Civil Aviation Authority's Radiotelephony manual

Maritime Mobile Service 

Voice procedures for use on ships and boats are defined by the International Telecommunication Union and the International Maritime Organization bodies of the United Nations, and by international treaties such as the Safety of Life a Sea Convention (a.k.a. SOLAS 74), and by other documents, such as the International Code of Signals.
 ITU Radio Regulations
 Appendix 18
 ITU maritime recommendations
 ITU-R M.1171: Radiotelephony procedures in the maritime mobile service. 
 IMO resolutions
 Resolution A.918(22) (covers Standard Marine Communication Phrases)

Police procedures 
In the U.S., the organization chartered with devising police communications procedures is APCO International, the Association of Police Communications Officers, which was founded in 1935. For the most part, APCO's procedures have been developed independently of the worldwide standard operating procedures, leading to most police departments using a different spelling alphabet, and the reverse order of calling procedure (e.g. 1-Adam-12 calling Dispatch).

However, APCO occasionally follows the international procedure standards, having adopted the U.S. Navy's Morse code procedure signs in the 1930s, and adopting the ICAO radiotelephony spelling alphabet in 1974, replacing its own Adam-Boy-Charles alphabet adopted in 1940, although very few U.S. police departments made the change.

APCO has also specified Standard Description Forms, a standard order of reporting information describing people and vehicles.

Standard description of persons 
The Standard Description of Persons format first appeared in the April 1950 edition of the APCO Bulletin. It starts with a description of the person themself and finishes with a description of what they are wearing at the time.

Standard description of automobiles 
APCO promotes the mnemonic CYMBALS for reporting vehicle descriptions:

Calling procedure 
The voice calling procedure (sometimes referred to as "method of calling" or "communications order model") is the standardized method of establishing communications. The order of transmitting the called station's call sign, followed by the calling station's call sign, was first specified for voice communications in the International Radiotelegraph Convention of Washington, 1927, however it matches the order used for the radiotelegraph calling procedure that had already existed since at least 1912. In the United States, the radiotelegraph calling procedure is legally defined in FCC regulations Part 80.97 (47 CFR 80.97(c)), which specifies that the method of calling begins with the call sign of the station called, not more than twice, [THIS IS] and the call sign of the calling station, not more than twice". This order is also specified by the ICAO for international aviation radio procedures (Annex 10 to the Convention on. International Civil Aviation: Aeronautical Telecommunications.), the FAA (Aeronautical Information Manual) and by the ITU-R for the Maritime Mobile Service (ITU-R M.1171), and the U.S. Coast Guard (Radiotelephone Handbook). The March, 1940 issue of The APCO Bulletin explains the origin of this order was found to have better results than other methods,
 MUST give the callsign of the station you are calling, twice (never three times)
 MUST follow the callsign with the proword THIS IS
 MUST give your callsign once, and once only
 Communicate
 SHOULD end your transmission with the proword OVER, or OUT, although this can be omitted when using a repeater that inserts a courtesy tone at the end of each transmission.

Break-in procedure 
Stations needing to interrupt other communications in-progress shall use the most appropriate of the below procedure words, followed by their call sign.

The use of these emergency signals is governed by the International Radio Regulations that have the force of law in most countries, and were originally defined in the International Code of Signals and the International Convention for the Safety of Life at Sea, so the rules for their use emanate from that document.

All of these break-in procedure words must be followed by your call sign, because that information will help the NCS determine the relevant importance when dealing with multiple break-ins of the same precedence, and to determine the relevance when multiple calls offering a CORRECTION or INFO are received.

Order of priority of communications 
The priority levels described below are derived from Article 44 of the ITU Radio Regulations, Chapter VIII, and were codified as early as the International Telecommunication Convention, Atlantic City, 1947 (but probably existed much earlier).

Procedure words 

Procedure words are a direct voice replacement for procedure signs (prosigns) and operating signals (such as Q codes), and must always be used on radiotelephone channels in their place. Prosigns/operating signals may only be used with Morse Code (as well as semaphore flags, light signals, etc.) and TTY (including all forms of landline and radio teletype, and Amateur radio digital interactive modes). The most complete set of procedure words is defined in the U.S. Military's Allied Communications Publication ACP 125(G).

Radio checks 
Whenever an operator is transmitting and uncertain of how good their radio and/or voice signal are, they can use the following procedure words to ask for a signal strength and readability report. This is the modern method of signal reporting that replaced the old 1 to 5 scale reports for the two aspects of a radio signal, and as with the procedure words, are defined in ACP 125(G):

The prowords listed below are for use when initiating and answering queries concerning signal strength and readability.

Signal strength prowords 
In the tables below, the mappings of the QSA and QRK Morse code prosigns is interpreted because there is not a 1:1 correlation. See QSA and QRK code for the full procedure specification.

Readability prowords 

The reporting format is one of the signal strength prowords followed by an appropriate conjunction, with that followed by one of the readability prowords:

LOUD AND CLEAR means Excellent copy with no noise

GOOD AND READABLE means Good copy with slight noise

FAIR BUT READABLE means Fair copy, occasional fills are needed

WEAK WITH INTERFERENCE means Weak copy, frequent fills are needed because of interference from other radio signals.

WEAK AND UNREADABLE means Unable to copy, a relay is required

According to military usage, if the response would be LOUD AND CLEAR, you may also respond simply with the proword ROGER. However, because this reporting format is not currently used widely outside of military organizations, it is better to always use the full format, so that there is no doubt about the response by parties unfamiliar with minimization and other shorthand radio operating procedures.

International Radiotelephony Spelling Alphabet 
The International Civil Aviation Organization (ICAO), International Telecommunication Union, and the International Maritime Organization (all agencies of the United Nations), plus NATO, all specify the use of the ICAO Radiotelephony Spelling Alphabet for use when it is necessary to spell out words, callsigns, and other letter/number sequences. It was developed with international cooperation and ratified in 1956, and has been in use unmodified ever since.

Rules for spelling 
Spelling is necessary when difficult radio conditions prevent the reception of an obscure word, or of a word or group, which is unpronounceable. Such words or groups within the text of plain language messages may be spelt using the phonetic alphabet; they are preceded by the proword "I SPELL". If the word is pronounceable and it is advantageous to do so, then it should be spoken before and after the spelling to help identify the word.

Rules for numbers and figures 
When radio conditions are satisfactory and confusion will not arise, numbers in the text of a message may be spoken as in normal speech. During difficult conditions, or when extra care is necessary to avoid misunderstanding, numbers are sent figure by figure preceded by the proword FIGURES. This proword warns that figures follow immediately, to help distinguish them from other similarly pronounced words.

Closing down
Ending a two-way radio call has its own set of procedures:
Generally, the station that originated the call is the station that should initiate termination of the call.
All stations indicate their last transmission of a particular communication exchange by using the proword OUT (I intend no further communication with you at this time) or OUT TO YOU (I am ending my communication with you and calling another station).
Stations going off the air (specifically turning their radio equipment off or leaving the station unattended) can additionally state that they are "closing" or "closing down", based on the proword command "CLOSE DOWN".

Radio nets 
Nets operate either on schedule or continuously (continuous watch). Nets operating on schedule handle traffic only at definite, prearranged times and in accordance with a prearranged schedule of intercommunication. Nets operating continuously are prepared to handle traffic at any time; they maintain operators on duty at all stations in the net at all times. When practicable, messages relating to schedules will be transmitted by a means of signal communication other than radio.

Net manager 
A net manager is the person who supervises the creation and operation of a net over multiple sessions. This person will specify the format, date, time, participants, and the net control script. The net manager will also choose the Net Control Station for each net, and may occasionally take on that function, especially in smaller organizations.

Net Control Station 
Radio nets are like conference calls in that both have a moderator who initiates the group communication, who ensures all participants follow the standard procedures, and who determines and directs when each other station may talk. The moderator in a radio net is called the Net Control Station, formally abbreviated NCS, and has the following duties:
 Establishes the net and closes the net;
 Directs Net activities, such as passing traffic, to maintain optimum efficiency;
 Chooses net frequency, maintains circuit discipline and frequency accuracy;
 Maintains a net log and records participation in the net and movement of messages; (always knows who is on and off net)
 Appoints one or more Alternate Net Control Stations (ANCS);
 Determines whether and when to conduct network continuity checks;
 Determines when full procedure and full call signs may enhance communications;
 Subject to Net Manager guidance, directs a net to be directed or free.
The Net Control Station will, for each net, appoint at least one Alternate Net Control Station, formally abbreviated ANCS (abbreviated NC2 in WWII procedures), who has the following duties:
 Assists the NCS to maintain optimum efficiency;
 Assumes NCS duties in event that the NCS develops station problems;
 Assumes NCS duties for a portion of the net, as directed or as needed;
 Serves as a resource for the NCS; echoes transmissions of the NCS if, and only if, directed to do so by the NCS;
 Maintains a duplicate net log

Structure of the net 
Nets can be described as always having a net opening and a net closing, with a roll call normally following the net opening, itself followed by regular net business, which may include announcements, official business, and message passing. Military nets will follow a very abbreviated and opaque version of the structure outlined below, but will still have the critical elements of opening, roll call, late check-ins, and closing.

A net should always operate on the same principle as the inverted pyramid used in journalism—the most important communications always come first, followed by content in ever lower levels of priority.
 Net opening
 Identification of the NCS
 Announcement of the regular date, time, and frequency of the net
 Purpose of the net
 Roll call
 A call for stations to check in, oftentimes from a roster of regular stations
 A call for late check-ins (stations on the roster who did not respond to the first check-in period)
 A call for guest stations to check in
 Net business
 Optional conversion to a free net
 Net closing
Each net will typically have a main purpose, which varies according to the organization conducting the net, which occurs during the net business phase. For amateur radio nets, it's typically for the purpose of allowing stations to discuss their recent operating activities (stations worked, antennas built, etc.) or to swap equipment. For Military Auxiliary Radio System and National Traffic System nets, net business will involve mainly the passing of formal messages, known as radiograms.

Time synchronization procedures 

Stations without the ability to acquire a time signal accurate to at least one second should request a time check at the start of every shift, or once a day minimum. Stations may ask the NCS for a time check by waiting for an appropriate pause, keying up and stating your call sign, and then using the prowords "REQUEST TIME CHECK, OVER" when the NCS calls on you. Otherwise, you may ask any station that has access to any of the above time signals for a time check.

Once requested, the sending station will state the current UTC time plus one minute, followed by a countdown as follows:This is Net Control, TIME CHECK WUN AIT ZERO TOO ZULU (pause) WUN FIFE SECONDS…WUN ZERO SECONDS…FIFE FOWER TREE TOO WUN…TIME WUN AIT ZERO TOO ZULU…OVERThe receiving station will then use the proword "TIME" as the synch mark, indicating zero seconds. If the local time is desired instead of UTC, substitute the time zone code "JULIETT" for "ZULU".

Instead of providing time checks on an individual basis, the NCS should give advance notice of a time check by stating, for example, "TIME CHECK AT 0900 JULIETT", giving all stations sufficient time to prepare their clocks and watches for adjustment. A period of at least five minutes is suggested.

Modes of radio net operation 
 Directed Net
 A net in which no station other than the net control station can communicate with any other station, except for the transmission of urgent messages, without first obtaining the permission of the net control station.
 Free net
 A net in which any station may communicate with any other station in the same net without first obtaining permission from the net control station to do so.

Types of net calls 
When calling stations who are part of a net, a variety of types of calls can be used:

Types of radio nets 
The Civil Air Patrol and International Amateur Radio Union define a number of different nets which represent the typical type and range used in civilian radio communications:

Radio net procedure words 
U.S. Army Field Manual ACP 125(G) has the most complete set of procedure words used in radio nets:

Example usage

Aeronautical mobile procedure

The Federal Aviation Administration uses the term phraseology to describe voice procedure or communications protocols used over telecommunications circuits. An example is air traffic control radio communications. Standardised wording is used and the person receiving the message may repeat critical parts of the message back to the sender. This is especially true of safety-critical messages. Consider this example of an exchange between a controller and an aircraft:

Aircraft: Boston Tower, Warrior three five foxtrot (35F), holding short of two two right.
Tower: Warrior three five foxtrot, Boston Tower, runway two two right, cleared for immediate takeoff. 
Aircraft: Roger, cleared for immediate takeoff, two two right, Warrier three five foxtrot.

On telecommunications circuits, disambiguation is a critical function of voice procedure. Due to any number of variables, including radio static, a busy or loud environment, or similarity in the phonetics of different words, a critical piece of information can be misheard or misunderstood; for instance, a pilot being ordered to eleven thousand as opposed to seven thousand (by hearing "even"). To reduce ambiguity, critical information may be broken down and read as separate letters and numbers. To avoid error or misunderstanding, pilots will often read back altitudes in the tens of thousands using both separate numbers and the single word (example: given a climb to 10,000 ft, the pilot replies "[Callsign] climbing to One zero, Ten Thousand"). However, this is usually only used to differentiate between 10,000 and 11,000 ft since these are the most common altitude deviations. The runway number read visually as eighteen, when read over a voice circuit as part of an instruction, becomes one eight. In some cases a spelling alphabet is used (also called a radio alphabet or a phonetic alphabet). Instead of the letters AB, the words Alpha Bravo are used. Main Street becomes Mike Alpha India November street, clearly separating it from Drain Street and Wayne Street. The numbers 5 and 9 are pronounced "fife" and "niner" respectively, since "five" and "nine" can sound the same over the radio. The use of 'niner' in place of 'nine' is due to German-speaking NATO allies for whom the spoken word 'nine' could be confused with the German word 'nein' or 'no'.

Over fire service radios, phraseology may include words that indicate the priority of a message, for example:

Forty Four Truck to the Bronx, Urgent!

or

San Diego, Engine Forty, Emergency traffic!

Words may be repeated to modify them from traditional use in order to describe a critical message:

Evacuate! Evacuate! Evacuate!

A similar technique may be used in aviation for critical messages. For example, this transmission might be sent to an aircraft that has just landed and has not yet cleared the runway.

Echo-Foxtrot-Charlie, Tower. I have engine out traffic on short final. Exit runway at next taxiway. Expedite! Expedite!

Police Radios also use this technique to escalate a call that is quickly becoming an emergency.

Code 3! Code 3! Code 3!

Railroads have similar processes. When instructions are read to a locomotive engineer, they are preceded by the train or locomotive number, direction of travel and the engineer's name. This reduces the possibility that a set of instructions will be acted on by the wrong locomotive engineer:

Five Sixty Six West, Engineer Jones, okay to proceed two blocks west to Ravendale.

Phraseology on telecommunications circuits may employ special phrases like ten codes, Sigalert, Quick Alert! or road service towing abbreviations such as T6. This jargon may abbreviate critical data and alert listeners by identifying the priority of a message. It may also reduce errors caused by ambiguities involving rhyming, or similar-sounding, words.

Maritime mobile procedure 
(Done on VHF Ch 16)

Boat "Albacore" talking to Boat "Bronwyn"

Albacore: Bronwyn, Bronwyn, Bronwyn* this is Albacore, OVER. (*3×1, repeating the receiver's callsign up to 3 times, and the sender's once, is proper procedure and should be used when first establishing contact, especially over a long distance. A 1×1, i.e. 'Bronwyn this is Albacore,' or 2×1, i.e. 'Bronwyn, Bronwyn, this is Albacore,' is less proper, but acceptable especially for a subsequent contact.)

Bronwyn: Albacore, this is Bronwyn, OVER. (** At this point switch to a working channel as 16 is for distress and hailing only**)

Albacore: This is Albacore. Want a tow and are you OK for tea at Osbourne Bay? OVER.

Bronwyn: This is Bronwyn. Negative, got engine running, 1600 at clubhouse fine with us. OVER.

Albacore: This is Albacore, ROGER, OUT.

"Copy that" is incorrect. COPY is used when a message has been intercepted by another station, i.e. a third station would respond:

Nonesuch: Bronwyn, this is Nonesuch. Copied your previous, will also see you there, OUT.

One should always use one's own callsign when transmitting.

British Army 

Station C21A (charlie-two-one Alpha) talking to C33B (charlie-three-three Bravo):

C21A: C33B, this is C21A, message, OVER.

C33B: C33B, send, OVER.

C21A: Have you got C1ØD Sunray at your location?, OVER.

C33B: Negative, I think he is with C3ØC, OVER.

C21A: Roger, OUT.

The advantage of this sequence is that the recipient always knows who sent the message.

The downside is that the listener only knows the intended recipient from the context of the conversation. Requires moderate signal quality for the radio operator to keep track of the conversations.

However a broadcast message and response is fairly efficient.

Sunray (Lead) Charlie Charlie (Collective Call - everyone), this is Sunray. Radio check, OVER.

C-E-5-9: Sunray, this is Charlie Echo five niner, LOUD AND CLEAR, OVER.

Y-S-7-2 Sunray, this is Yankee Sierra Seven Two, reading three by four. OVER.

B-G-5-2: Sunray, this is Bravo Golf Five Two, Say again. OVER.

E-F-2-0: Sunray, this is Echo Foxtrot Two Zero, reading Five by Four OVER.

Sunray: Charlie Charlie this is Sunray, OUT.

The "Say again" response from B-G-5-2 tells Sunray that the radio signal is not good and possibly unreadable. Sunray can then re-initiate a Call onto B-G-5-2 and start another R/C or instruct them to relocate, change settings, etc.

So it could carry on with:

Sunray: Bravo Golf Five Two this is sunray, RADIO CHECK OVER.

B-G-5-2: Sunray this is Bravo Golf Five Two, unclear, read you 2 by 3 OVER.

Sunray: Sunray copies, Relocate to Grid One Niner Zero Three Three Two for a better signal OVER.

B-G-5-2: Bravo Golf Five Two copies and is Oscar Mike, Bravo Golf Five Two OUT.

See also 
Radiotelephone
Mobile radio
Two-way radio
Plain Language Radio Checks
QSA and QRK code (for Morse code only)
R-S-T system (for Amateur radio only)
Signal strength and readability report
Circuit Merit (for wired and wireless telephone circuits only, not radiotelephony)
ICAO spelling alphabet
List of international common standards
Mayday
Military slang
Procedure word
Station identification
Allied Communication Procedures

Notes

External links 
Origins of Hamspeak
Rec. ITU-R M.1171 Radiotelephony Procedures in the Maritime Mobile Service

Military communications
Public safety communications
Radio communications
Oral communication

fr:Vocabulaire radio professionnel
id:Prosedur suara
he:נדב"ר